Deutsch Kaltenbrunn is a town in the district of Jennersdorf in Burgenland in Austria.

Geography
Cadastral communities are Deutsch Kaltenbrunn and Rohrbrunn.

Population

References

Cities and towns in Jennersdorf District
Slovenian communities in Burgenland